Earl of Inchcape is a title in the Peerage of the United Kingdom. It was created in 1929 for the Scottish shipping magnate and public servant James Mackay, who had been created Baron Inchcape, of Strathnaver in the County of Sutherland, in 1911, and Viscount Inchcape, of Strathnaver in the County of Sutherland, in 1924. Inchcape was made Viscount Glenapp, of Strathnaver in the County of Sutherland, at the same time as he was given the earldom. These titles are also in the Peerage of the United Kingdom.

The family seat is Carlock House, near Ballantrae, Ayrshire. The former family seat was Glenapp Castle, which is currently a luxury hotel, and which was sold by the Mackay family in 1982, having been acquired by the 1st Earl of Inchcape in 1917. The present Earl of Inchcape, however, still owns the Glenapp Estate.

Earls of Inchcape (1929)
James Lyle Mackay, 1st Earl of Inchcape (1852–1932)
Kenneth Mackay, 2nd Earl of Inchcape (1887–1939) 
Kenneth James William Mackay, 3rd Earl of Inchcape (1917–1994)
Kenneth Peter Lyle Mackay, 4th Earl of Inchcape (b. 1943)
The heir apparent is the present holder's only son Fergus James Kenneth Mackay, Viscount Glenapp (b. 1979).
The heir apparent's heir apparent is his son, the Hon. Alexander David James Mackay (b. 2017).

Line of Succession

  James Lyle Mackay, 1st Earl of Inchcape (1852–1932)
  Kenneth Mackay, 2nd Earl of Inchcape (1887–1939)
  Kenneth James William Mackay, 3rd Earl of Inchcape (1917–1994)
  Kenneth Peter Lyle Mackay, 4th Earl of Inchcape (born 1943)
 (1) Fergus James Kenneth Mackay, Viscount Glenapp (b. 1979)
 (2) Hon. Alexander David James Mackay (b. 2017)
 (3) Hon. James Jonathan Thorn Mackay (b. 1947)
 (4) Aidan James Turner Mackay (b. 1978)
 (5) Hon. Shane Mackay (b. 1973)
 (6) Hon. Ivan Cholmeley Mackay (b. 1976)
 (7)  Simon Brooke Mackay, Baron Tanlaw (born 1934)
 (8) Hon. James Brooke Mackay (b. 1961)
 (9) Hon. Brooke Brooke Mackay (b. 1982)

See also
Inchcape
Inchcape plc

References

Work cited

Earldoms in the Peerage of the United Kingdom
Noble titles created in 1929